Arthur Franklin (6 February 1918 – 22 December 1953) was an Australian rules footballer who played for the Melbourne Football Club in the Victorian Football League (VFL).

Notes

External links 

1918 births
Australian rules footballers from Victoria (Australia)
Melbourne Football Club players
1953 deaths